This list of tunnels in Belgium includes any road or waterway tunnel in Belgium. For railway, cycling and pedestrian tunnels, it includes only major (named) tunnels.

Road tunnels

Brussels

Arts-Loi/Kunst-Wet Tunnel, R20
Bailli/Baljuw Tunnel, N24
Basilique Nord/Basiliek Noord Tunnel, R20
Basilique Sud/Basiliek Zuid Tunnel, R20
Belliard Tunnel, N23
Boileau Tunnel, R21
Botanique/Kruidtuin Tunnel, R20
Cinquantenaire/Jubelpark Tunnel, N3
Delta Tunnel, N210
Georges-Henri Tunnel, R21
Kortenberg Tunnel, N23
Leopold II Tunnel, R20
Loi/Wet Tunnel, N3
Louise/Louiza Tunnel, R20
Madou Tunnel, R20
Montgomery Tunnel, R21
Porte de Hal/Hallepoort Tunnel, R20
Porte de Namur/Naamsepoort Tunnel, R20
Reyers Tunnel, R21-N23-A3
Rogier Tunnel, R20
Stéphanie/Stefania Tunnel, N24
Tervueren/Tervuren Tunnel, N3
Trône/Troontunnel, R20
Van Praet Tunnel, R21
Vleurgat Tunnel, N24
Woluwe Tunnel, R22

Flanders

Waaslandtunnel under the Scheldt, Antwerp
Kennedy Tunnel, E17 under the Scheldt, Antwerp
Liefkenshoek Tunnel, R2, Antwerp
Craeybeckx Tunnel, E19, Antwerp
Frans Tijsmans Tunnel, R2, Antwerp
Bevrijdingstunnel, A12, Antwerp
Jan de Vos Tunnel, A12, Antwerp
Rupel Tunnel, A12, Boom
Beveren Tunnel, R2, Beveren
Ringlaan Tunnel, R31, Ostend
Tunnel 't Zand, R30, Bruges
Tunnel Wevelgem, E403, Wevelgem
Sint-Lievenstunnel, R40, Ghent
Zelzatetunnel, E34 under Ghent–Terneuzen Canal, Zelzate

Wallonia

Tunnel du Bois d'Houtaing, E429
Tunnel de Rebaix, E429
Tunnel de Couillet, R3, Charleroi
Tunnel d'Hublinbu, R3, Charleroi
Tunnel de Cointe, A602, Liège
Tunnel de Kinkempois, A602, Liège
Tunnel des Grosses Battes, A602, Liège

Cycling and pedestrian tunnels 

 Sint-Annatunnel (also Voetgangerstunnel), under the Scheldt, Antwerp
 Kennedy Cycling Tunnel, part of bicycle highway FR10 (Ringfietspad), under the Scheldt, Antwerp

Railway tunnels
Kennedy Rail Tunnel, Antwerp
Soumagne Tunnel, on the HSL 3 line, east of Liège
Halle Tunnel, on the HSL 1 in Halle

many more in the south

See also
List of tunnels by location

Belgium
Tunnels
 
Tunnels